Babak (also Romanized as Bābak) is a village in Gug Tappeh Rural District of the Central District of Bileh Savar County, Ardabil province, Iran. At the 2006 census, its population was 2,673 in 478 households. The following census in 2011 counted 1,852 people in 727 households. The latest census in 2016 showed a population of 2,656 people in 760 households; it was the largest village in its rural district.

References 

Bileh Savar County

Populated places in Ardabil Province

Populated places in Bileh Savar County

Towns and villages in Bileh Savar County